Minister for Small Business is a position in the government of Western Australia, currently held by Paul Papalia of the Labor Party. The position was first created in 1984, for the government of Brian Burke, and has existed in most governments since then. The minister is responsible for the state government's Small Business Development Corporation.

Titles
 20 December 1984 – present: Minister for Small Business

List of ministers

See also
 Minister for Commerce (Western Australia)
 Minister for Finance (Western Australia)
 Treasurer of Western Australia

References
 David Black (2014), The Western Australian Parliamentary Handbook (Twenty-Third Edition). Perth [W.A.]: Parliament of Western Australia.

Small Business
Minister for Small Business
Small business
1984 establishments in Australia